Het Beijersche is a town in the Dutch province of South Holland. It is a part of the municipality of Krimpenerwaard, and lies about 4 km south of Gouda.

The statistical area "Het Beijersche", which also can include the surrounding countryside, has a population of around 350.

Until 2015, Het Beijersche was part of Vlist.

References
 

Populated places in South Holland
Krimpenerwaard